St Peter and St Paul's Church, Water Orton is a Grade II listed Church of England parish church in Water Orton, Warwickshire, England.

History

The medieval church was demolished and a new church erected by Bateman and Corser. The foundation stone for the new church was laid on 11 September 1878 by Mrs. J. D. W. Digby. The land was given by G.W. Digby of Sherborne Castle, Dorset. This church was consecrated on 7 October 1879 by the Bishop of Worcester. It was built in Derbyshire stone with Bath stone dressings. The contractor was H. Mottram of Tamworth.

The spire was removed in the 1980s. (after 1987)

Organ

An organ by Forster and Andrews was installed in 1885. A specification of the organ can be found on the National Pipe Organ Register.

References

Church of England church buildings in Warwickshire
Churches completed in 1879
Grade II listed buildings in Warwickshire